Come to Vienna, I'll Show You Something! is a 1970 Austrian-West German comedy film directed by Rolf Thiele and starring Tanja Gruber, Veit Relin, and Andrea Rau. A sex comedy, it presents several events in the history of Vienna.

Main cast

References

Bibliography

External links

1970s sex comedy films
1970s historical comedy films
Austrian sex comedy films
Austrian historical comedy films
German sex comedy films
German historical comedy films
West German films
Films directed by Rolf Thiele
Constantin Film films
Films set in Vienna
Cultural depictions of Adolf Hitler
1970s German-language films
1970s German films